The Zbroyar Z-10 is a 7.62×51mm NATO sniper rifle manufactured by Zbroyar and is based on the ArmaLite AR-10.

History
The first Z-10 rifles were manufactured in May 2012.

By the beginning of the spring of 2014, the company was fully self-sufficient in receivers, bolt frames and gas systems, but the barrels for the produced weapons were imported, they were mainly purchased in the US and Spain. In connection with the devaluation of the hryvnia in 2014–2015. trunks were bought in small batches. After the outbreak War in Donbass in Spring 2014, Zbroyar stepped up cooperation with the leadership of the state power structures of Ukraine to participate in military orders.

In October 2015, photographs were published of the use by servicemen of the 79th Air Assault Brigade of two Z-10 rifles equipped with optical sights, bipods, Luth-AR butts and Ergogrip handles.

In August 2017, the use of the Z-10 rifle by the military personnel of the armed forces of Ukraine during the fighting in the Donbass was mentioned. Later, it became known that 82 Z-10 rifles were purchased and transferred to the troops at his own expense by Petro Poroshenko. On 25 August, the General Director of Zbroyar LLC S. Gorban said in an interview that the company had mastered the mass production of the Z-10 rifle and was capable of independently producing 85% of its components. On 1 September, Gorban said in an interview that the company has mastered the independent production of 87% of the Z-10 components, but blanks for the manufacture of barrels and some other components are imported. He also said that the company is offering the Z-10 rifle as a replacement for the Soviet-made SVD sniper rifles in service with Ukrainian law enforcement agencies and has already handed over two rifles to the Ministry of Defence for testing. In addition, the rifles were bought and used during the hostilities in the Donbass by military personnel, border guards and employees of the Security Service.

In 2018, a version of the Z-10 rifle chambered for 7.62 × 51 mm was adopted for armament of the Armed Forces of Ukraine under the name 7.62-mm self-loading sniper rifle UAR-10. On 8 November 2019, Colonel Vladislav Shostak, a representative of the Department of Military-Technical Policy, Development of Weapons and Military Equipment of the Ministry of Defense of Ukraine, said that in 2019 the troops received about 600 UAR-10 and UAR-008 sniper rifles.

Users

 : Armed Forces of Ukraine

References

External links

7.62×51mm NATO battle rifles
Sniper rifles of Ukraine
Weapons and ammunition introduced in 2012